is a Japanese manga artist. He is most famous for illustrating the series Star of the Giants. He won the 14th Shogakukan Manga Award in 1969 for Animal 1 and Inakappe Taishō as well as the eighth Kodansha Children's Manga Award for Star of the Giants in 1967 and its successor Kodansha Manga Award in shōnen category for Football Hawk in 1978. He is also the creator of The Song of Tentomushi, Skyers 5 and Kōya no Shōnen Isamu.

Works
 Ame ni mo Makezu (4 volumes, 1983)
 Animal 1 (4 volumes, 1968)
 Captain Gorou (1 volume, 1968)
 Daimakujira (1 volume, 1968)
 Doudou Yarou (1 volume, 1970)
 Football Hawk (10 volumes, 1977)
 Fukidamari (1 volume, 1976)
 Honoo no Michi (1 volume, 1987)
 Inakappe Taishō (6 volumes, 1970)
 Isamu the Wilderness Boy (12 volumes, 1971)
 Kuroi Kuroi Tani (2 volumes, 1967)
 Musashi (13 volumes, 1974)
 Otoko no Jouken (2 volumes, 1968)
 Rounin Tanbee Zetsumei (1 volume, 1987)
 Shi no Toride (1 volume, 1967)
 Skyers 5 (3 volumes, 1966–1968)
 Star of the Giants (Kyojin no Hoshi) written by Ikki Kajiwara (19 volumes, 1966)
 Shin Kyojin no Hoshi written by Ikki Kajiwara (11 volumes, 1978)
 Shinigami Hakase 1967
 The Song of Tentomushi (4 volumes, 1973)
 Tiger 66 (1 volume, 1968)

References

External links
 

Manga artists from Osaka Prefecture
People from Osaka
1941 births
Winner of Kodansha Manga Award (Shōnen)
Living people
Gekiga creators